Cobbler is a dessert consisting of a fruit (or less commonly savory) filling poured into a large baking dish and covered with a batter, biscuit, or dumpling (in the United Kingdom) before being baked. Some cobbler recipes, especially in the American South, resemble a thick-crusted, deep-dish pie with both a top and bottom crust. Cobbler is part of the cuisine of the United Kingdom and United States, and should not be confused with a crumble.

Origin
Cobblers originated in the British American colonies. English settlers were unable to make traditional suet puddings due to lack of suitable ingredients and cooking equipment, so instead covered a stewed filling with a layer of uncooked plain biscuits, scone batter or dumplings, fitted together. The origin of the name cobbler, recorded from 1859, is uncertain: it may be related to the archaic word cobeler, meaning "wooden bowl". or the term may be due to the topping having the visual appearance of a 'cobbled' stone pathway rather than a 'smooth' paving which would otherwise be represented by a rolled out pastry topping.

Varieties
Note the crisp and crumble differ from the cobbler in that the former's top layers may also include rolled oats made with oatmeal.

North America

Grunts, pandowdy, and slumps are Canadian Maritimes, New England and Pennsylvania Dutch (Apple Pan Dowdy) varieties of cobbler, typically cooked on the stovetop, or in an iron skillet or pan, with the dough on top in the shape of dumplings. They reportedly take their name from the grunting sound they make while cooking. Another name for the types of biscuits or dumplings used is dough-boys. Dough-boys are used in stews and cobblers alike.

In the United States, additional varieties of cobbler include the apple pan dowdy (an apple cobbler whose crust has been broken and perhaps stirred back into the filling), the Betty, the buckle (made with yellow batter (like cake batter), with the filling mixed in with the batter), the dump (or dump cake), the grump, the slump, and the sonker.  The sonker is unique to North Carolina: it is a deep-dish version of the American cobbler.

Cobblers most commonly come in single fruit varieties and are named as such, e.g. blackberry, blueberry, and peach cobbler. The tradition also gives the option of topping the fruit cobbler with a scoop or two of vanilla ice cream. Savory cobblers are less common in the region; for example, tomato cobbler, which may include onion and a biscuit topping that may include cheese or cornmeal, is one savory variant that also resembles Southern tomato pie.  Old California orchard cuisine features peach, pear, apricot, and, most prized by many, tartarian cherry cobblers.

The Texas Legislature designated peach cobbler as the official cobbler of Texas in 2013.

Betty
The American variant known as the Betty or brown Betty dates from at least the early 19th century.  In 1864, in the Yale Literary Magazine, it appeared with "brown" in lower case, thus making "Betty" the proper name.  In 1890, however, a recipe was published in Practical Sanitary and Economic Cooking Adapted to Persons of Moderate and Small Means with the word "Brown" capitalized, rendering "Brown Betty" the proper name.

Brown Betties are made with breadcrumbs (or bread pieces, or graham cracker crumbs), and fruit, usually diced apples, in alternating layers. They are baked covered and have a consistency like bread pudding.

In the midwestern United States, apple Betty is often a synonym for apple crisp.

UK and Commonwealth

In the UK and Commonwealth of Nations, the scone-topped cobbler predominates, and is found in both sweet and savory versions. Common sweet fillings include apple, blackberry, and peach. Savory versions, such as beef, lamb, or mutton, consist of a casserole filling, sometimes with a simple ring of cobbles around the edge, rather than a complete layer, to aid cooking of the meat. Cheese or herb scones may also be used as a savory topping.

Cobblers and crumbles were promoted by the Ministry of Food during the Second World War, since they are filling, yet require less butter than a traditional pastry, and can be made with margarine.

See also

 Apple crisp
 Pudding

References

External links 
 
 

American desserts
British desserts
Desserts
Fruit pies
Cuisine of the Southern United States
Thanksgiving food
Christmas food
Baked goods